Roviata is a village and a community in the municipal unit of Amaliada in the northwestern part of Elis, Greece. It is located in the plains near the Ionian Sea, 1 km southeast of Savalia, 6 km northwest of Kardamas, 5 km west of Amaliada and 6 km southeast of Gastouni. The Greek National Road 9/E55 (Patras - Pyrgos) passes southwest of the village. The community includes the small villages Kasidiaris, Paralia and Romeika.

Historical population

External links
Roviata (in Greek)

See also
List of settlements in Elis

References

Populated places in Elis